William M. Makell (June 22, 1922 – May 1967), also listed as Frank Makell, was an American baseball catcher in the Negro leagues. He played with the Baltimore Elite Giants in 1943 and the Newark Eagles in 1944.

References

External links
 and Seamheads

Baltimore Elite Giants players
Newark Eagles players
1922 births
1967 deaths
Baseball players from Washington, D.C.
People from Washington, D.C.
Baseball catchers
20th-century African-American sportspeople